Stanley Glenn Bowman (born June 28, 1973) is a Canadian-American former ice hockey executive. He previously worked as the general manager of the Chicago Blackhawks of the National Hockey League (NHL). He is the son of Hockey Hall of Fame member, and former senior advisor for the Blackhawks, Scotty Bowman. 

In October 2021, Bowman resigned from the Chicago Blackhawks organization, and as the general manager of the U.S. Olympic men's hockey team, in response to the results of an independent investigation into allegations of sexual assault committed by a member of the Blackhawks' video coaching staff. The lead investigator stated that Bowman's failure to report the alleged assault eventually led to the perpetrator committing further acts of sexual abuse.

Early life
Bowman was born in Montreal, Quebec. He moved to Buffalo, New York during his father's tenure with the Buffalo Sabres and attended Canisius High School. Bowman graduated from the University of Notre Dame in 1995 with degrees in Finance and Computer Applications. He lived in Keenan Hall.

Executive career

Bowman joined the Chicago Blackhawks in 2001 as a special assistant to the general manager for four seasons. For the next two years, he would serve as the director of hockey operations. Afterwards, Bowman was promoted to assistant general manager of hockey operations.

On July 14, 2009, Bowman replaced Dale Tallon to become the ninth general manager in the Blackhawks' history. Bowman stepped into the role following three years as a special assistant to the general manager of the club. On October 4, 2011, Bowman signed a contract with the Blackhawks effective through the 2015–16 season.

On June 9, 2010, the Blackhawks won their fourth Stanley Cup, and first since 1961, defeating the Philadelphia Flyers in the Finals. On June 24, 2013, the Blackhawks won the Stanley Cup again, defeating the Boston Bruins in the Finals. On June 15, 2015, the Blackhawks won the Stanley Cup for the third time in six years, defeating the Tampa Bay Lightning in the 2015 Stanley Cup Finals.

On December 16, 2020, the Blackhawks promoted Bowman to president of hockey operations. The move came after the Blackhawks fired John McDonough in April, and delegated his responsibilities between Bowman and Jaime Faulkner, who was hired as the president of business operations.

On March 31, 2021, Bowman was appointed the general manager of the U.S. Olympic men's hockey team for the 2022 Beijing Games.

On October 26, 2021, Bowman resigned from the Chicago Blackhawks organization in response to the results of an independent investigation into allegations of sexual assault committed by Brad Aldrich, a member of the Blackhawks' video coaching staff. The lead investigator, former assistant US attorney Reid Schar, stated that Bowman's failure to report the alleged assault had consequences, eventually leading to the perpetrator committing further acts of sexual abuse. 

Bowman also resigned as the general manager of the U.S. Olympic men's hockey team the same day. Bowman had served as a member of an advisory group for USA Hockey since 2012, helping select players and staff.

Personal life
Bowman and his wife Suzanne have three children.

He is named after the Stanley Cup; his father won his first Stanley Cup, as coach of the Montreal Canadiens, just one month before Stan's birth.

In 2007, Bowman was diagnosed with Hodgkin's lymphoma, cancer of the lymph nodes.  The cancer went into remission after chemotherapy, but reappeared in early 2008, necessitating a stem cell transplant, radiation and more chemotherapy.  As of 2013, the cancer was in remission.

References

External links
 Stan Bowman's trades as GM of the Blackhawks

1973 births
Living people
Anglophone Quebec people
Chicago Blackhawks executives
National Hockey League executives
National Hockey League general managers
Ice hockey people from Montreal
Stanley Cup champions
University of Notre Dame alumni